Shirkoak is a hamlet in the civil parish of Woodchurch,  southwest of the town of Ashford in Kent, England.

External links

Villages in Kent